Julian "Fighting Farrier" Holland (born 13 October 1972 in Bendigo) is an Australian professional welter/light middleweight boxer of the 1990s and 2000s who won the Queensland (Australia) State welterweight title, Pan Pacific welterweight title, Australian welterweight title, Oceanic Boxing Association welterweight title, Australasian welterweight title, Pan Pacific light middleweight title, World Boxing Organization (WBO) Asia Pacific welterweight title, and Commonwealth light welterweight title, his professional fighting weight varied from , i.e. welterweight to , i.e. light middleweight.

Professional boxing record

References

External links

Image - Julian Holland

1972 births
Light-middleweight boxers
Living people
Sportspeople from Bendigo
Welterweight boxers
Australian male boxers
Commonwealth Boxing Council champions